Crocetta (Italian for Little Cross) may refer to:

Places in Italy

Towns
 Crocetta del Montello, a municipality (comune) in the Province of Treviso
 Crocetta, a former municipality in the Province of Rovigo, now a frazione of Badia Polesine

Town suburbs
 Crocetta (Cinisello Balsamo), a frazione of Milan
 Crocetta, a frazione of Villafranca d'Asti
 Crocetta, a frazione of Montefino
 La Crocetta, a frazione of Toano
 Crocetta, a frazione of Longi
 Crocetta, a frazione of Longiano
 Crocetta, a frazione of Castel Frentano
 Crocetta, a frazione of Medicina
 Crocetta, a frazione of Cinisello Balsamo
 La Crocetta, a frazione of Tronzano Lago Maggiore
 La Crocetta, a district of Turin
 Crocetta, a district (circoscrizione) of Modena

Other places in Italy
 Crocetta (Milan Metro), a station of Milan Metro
 Colle della Crocetta, a hill in the Graian Alps
 Palazzo della Crocetta, a palace in Florence

Other uses
 Crocetta of Caltanissetta, an Italian dessert

See also
 Crocotta, a mythical dog-wolf